Rufous-naped wren has been split into three species:
 Veracruz wren, Campylorhynchus rufinucha
 Sclater's wren, Campylorhynchus humilis
 Rufous-backed wren, Campylorhynchus capistratus

note: the name rufous-naped wren is retained for the Veracruz wren by some taxonomic authorities. Some taxonomic authorities do not recognize the split, including the American Ornithological Society.

Birds by common name